André Vallée (July 31, 1930 – February 28, 2015) was a Roman Catholic bishop.

Ordained to the priesthood in 1956, Vallée was named bishop of the Military Ordinariate of Canada in 1987 and served until 1996. In 1995, he was appointed bishop of the Roman Catholic Diocese of Hearst and retired in 2005.

Notes

1930 births
2015 deaths
20th-century Roman Catholic bishops in Canada
21st-century Roman Catholic bishops in Canada
Roman Catholic bishops of Hearst–Moosonee